The Open Source Metaverse Project (OSMP) was a multi-participant shared virtual world online platform.  This platform was free and open-source software co-founded in 2004 by Hugh Perkins and Jorge Lima.

OSMP is loosely modeled on the World Wide Web borrowing ideas from existing worlds such as Second Life, Active Worlds, and There.  This project aims to produce an open-source engine for the creation of streamed 3D worlds, also making it possible to interconnect existing worlds into a single open, standards-based Metaverse.

In 2005, ACMSIGGRAPH conducted a reachout campaign to the art and animation 
community, asking for course proposals about the nature of open source and its use in computer graphics and interactive techniques.  OSMP was contacted by Dr. John Fujii as part of this initiative, in order to organize a collaborative online meeting space for SIGGRAPH 2005 members. 

As of 2008, the project was no longer active.  Most developers shifted focus to development of open-source software compatible with Second Life such as OpenSimulator.

See also

Solipsis
Snow Crash
OpenSimulator

External links
Official website
OSMP Wiki
OSMP forums

References

2004 software
Free software
Virtual world communities
Lua (programming language)-scriptable software